The 2022 Portuguese Social Democratic Party leadership election was held on 28 May 2022. If no candidate achieved more than 50% of the votes in the first round, a second round would be held between the two most voted candidates in the first round on 4 June 2022, however, as only two candidates were on the ballot, Luís Montenegro and Jorge Moreira da Silva, a second round was not necessary.

The elections came after the defeat of the Social Democratic Party (PSD) in the 2022 Portuguese legislative election, where António Costa of the Socialist Party (PS) achieved an absolute majority. During election night, Rui Rio, the incumbent leader of the PSD, declared that he does not see how he could be useful in a PS majority. On 3 February 2022, Rio announced his intention of leaving the PSD leadership and proposed the calling of a snap leadership election.

Luís Montenegro defeated Jorge Moreira da Silva by a landslide, 72% to 28%, and was elected as the new PSD leader; however, turnout dropped to just above 60%. Montenegro won all the districts in the country and didn't prevail in just 38 municipalities, out of 308.

Candidates

Declined 

 Rui Rio, incumbent President of PSD and Leader of the Opposition (since 2018); former Mayor of Porto (2001-2013);
 Luís Marques Mendes, political commentator; former leader of the PSD (2005-2007).
 Carlos Moedas, Mayor of Lisbon (since 2021); European Commissioner for Research, Science and Innovation (2014-2019);
 Pedro Passos Coelho, former Prime Minister (2011-2015); former leader of the PSD (2010-2018);
 Paulo Rangel, Member of the European Parliament (since 2009); candidate for the party leadership in the 2021 elections.
 Miguel Poiares Maduro, Minister for Regional Development (2013-2015);
 José Ribau Esteves, Mayor of Ílhavo (1998-2013); Mayor of Aveiro (since 2013);
 Miguel Pinto Luz, deputy mayor of Cascais (since 2017); candidate for the party leadership in the 2020 elections;
 Pedro Rodrigues, former Social Democratic Youth leader (2007-2010); former member of the Assembly of the Republic (2019-2022; 2009-2011).
 André Coelho Lima, Member of the Assembly of the Republic from Braga (since 2019).

Opinion polls

All voters

PSD voters

Results

See also 
 Elections in Portugal
 List of political parties in Portugal

References

External links 
 PSD Official website

2022 elections in Portugal
Portuguese Social Democratic Party
Social Democratic Party (Portugal)
Political party leadership elections in Portugal